Vulpiella is a genus of plants in the grass family. The only known species is Vulpiella stipoides, native to the western Mediterranean region (Algeria, Morocco, Tunisia, Libya, Italy, France, Spain Portugal; including islands of Sardinia, Corsica, Sicily, and the Baleares).

The type species is Cutandia incrassata (Salzm. ex Lois.) Batt. & Trab.

References

External links
Grassbase - The World Online Grass Flora

Pooideae
Monotypic Poaceae genera